T34 may refer to:

Vehicles 
 T-34, a Soviet tank circa 1940
 T34 Calliope, a World War II American tank-mounted rocket launcher 
 T34 Heavy Tank, an American tank
 Beechcraft T-34 Mentor, an American trainer aircraft
 Slingsby T.34 Sky, a British glider
 ,  a German warship of World War II

Other uses 
 T34 (classification), a disability classification used in para-athletics
 T-34 (film), a 2019 Russian war film
 T34 (microprocessor), a microprocessor compatible with the Zilog Z80
 Pratt & Whitney T34, a turboprop aero engine
 T-34, a rock band featuring Al Murray